Mahrouna is a small agribusiness town located in the south of Lebanon.

It is situated at a distance of 100 kilometres from Beirut, the capital, and 18 kilometres to the southeast of the city of Tyre. Mahrouna stands at a height of 400 meters above sea level. The population count is at approximately 3,800 inhabitants, however this number increases to about 5,000 during the vacations and summer times.

According to a municipal member, this is the city of origin of the Lebanese poet and politician Tannus Alejandro Wehbe Malik who left for Colombia during the late Ottoman period. He is also directly related to the Lebanese singer and actress Haifa Wehbe, also native to Mahrouna, and Jorge Wehbe, director at the Bank of the Province of Buenos Aires in 1955.

Name
E. H. Palmer wrote that the name Mahrûneh came from "'carded' (as cotton)."

History
In 1875 Victor Guérin found it to be a Metawileh village, he further noted: "Here are traces of a surrounding wall, ancient materials, a tomb cut in the rock, and a quarry, a part of which has been formed into a tank."

In 1881, the PEF's Survey of Western Palestine (SWP) described it as: "A village, built of stone, containing about 150 Metawileh; no houses of note; situated on a hill, surrounded by olives, figs, and arable land, with a spring and cisterns."

This peaceful quiet town is rich with its green surrounding, but it is especially famous for its oak and olive trees hill which forms a natural park for the town’s residents. This hill has an ancient ruin at the top with large squared stones arranged on top of each other to form part of a solid wall corner. The residents believe it to be the remains of a small castle or stronghold.Unfortunately, this greenly oak hill has been bombarded several times since the 1970s by the Israeli jets. As a result, large numbers of oak trees were burnt in some parts of the hill, especially in 2006.

Mahrouna became a municipality in 2004. During these municipal elections, nine municipal council members were elected for six years, with Kamal Wehbe elected president. Currently the municipality runs the services required for the town independently, although still remaining under the control of the central government.

Haifa Wehbe, one of the most famous artists in the Arab world, was born in Mahrouna; she also won Miss South Lebanon in 1992, and was runner up for Miss Lebanon in 1996.

Demography 
The town is predominantly inhabited by Shia Muslims, though the surrounding area also has a significant Christian minority.

Gallery

References

Bibliography

Sources
Municipality of Mahrouna 
Ministry of Interior and Municipalities, Republic of Lebanon

External links

 Survey of Western Palestine, Map 2:  IAA, Wikimedia Commons
 Mahrouna, Localiban

Populated places in Tyre District
Shia Muslim communities in Lebanon